S. S. Stevens may refer to:

 Stanley Smith Stevens, an American psychologist
 SS Stevens, a ship used as a floating dormitory